Zele is a municipality located in the Belgian province of East Flanders, around 20 km east of Ghent. The municipality only comprises the town of Zele proper. In 2021, Zele had a total population of 21,333. The total area is 33.06 km2 which gives a population density.

Famous inhabitants
 Basile De Loose, painter (1809–1885)
 Pierre de Decker, former Prime Minister of Belgium (1855–1857) (1812–1891)
 Aloïs de Beule, sculptor (1861–1935)
 Filip De Wilde, professional football player (b. 1964)
 Lieven Maesschalck, physiotherapist (b. 1964)
 Christophe Impens, Belgian record holder 1500 m run, semi-finalist at Atlanta Olympics (b. 1969)
 Caroline Maes, professional tennis player (b. 1982)
 Vanessa Van Cartier, drag queen and winner of Drag Race Holland (b. 1979)

References

External links

Official website 

Municipalities of East Flanders
Populated places in East Flanders